Yingvirus is a genus of negative-strand RNA viruses which infect invertebrates. Member viruses have bisegmented genomes. It is the only genus in the family Qinviridae, which is the only family in Muvirales, which is the only order in Chunqiuviricetes. There are eight species in the genus.

Etymology 

Genome 
Yingviruses have linear, negative-sense, bisegmented RNA genomes. Genome lengths for four member species are:
 Beihai yingvirus: Beihai sesarmid crab virus 4 (7380 nt)
 Hubei yingvirus: Hubei qinvirus-like virus 1 (7366 nt)
 Sanxia yingvirus: Sanxia Qinvirus-like virus 1 (8238 nt)
 Wenzhou yingvirus: Wenzhou qinvirus-like virus 2 (8052 nt)

Taxonomy  

The following species are recognized:

Beihai yingvirus
Charybdis yingvirus
Hubei yingvirus
Sanxia yingvirus
Shahe yingvirus
Wenzhou yingvirus
Wuhan yingvirus
Xinzhou yingvirus

References

Virus genera
Negarnaviricota